Megathyrsus maximus, known as Guinea grass and green panic grass, is a large perennial bunch grass that is native to Africa and Yemen. It has been introduced in the tropics around the world. It has previously been called Urochloa maxima and Panicum maximum. It was moved to the genus Megathyrsus in 2003.

Description
Megathyrsus maximus grows naturally in open grasslands, usually under or near trees and shrubs and along riverbanks. It can withstand wildfire and drought. The plant also can reproduce through apomixis, effectively cloning itself through seed. Panicles are open, with as many as 9,000 seeds per plant.

Uses
It can be used as a long-term foraging grass if grazed consistently and if fertilized. It is well suited for cut-and-carry, a practice in which grass is harvested and brought to a ruminant animal in an enclosed system. Shade tolerance makes it suited to coexisting with trees in agroforestry. Some varieties have been used successfully for making silage and hay. The leaves contain good levels of protein, 6-25% depending on age and nitrogen supply.

Invasive species
In some places, such as South Texas, Sri Lanka and Hawai'i, it is an invasive weed that suppresses or displaces local native plants and is a fire hazard.

In the Australian state of Queensland, the Queensland Acclimatisation Society introduced Guinea grass to 22 locations between 1865 and 1869.

References

External links

Panicoideae
Bunchgrasses of Africa
Flora of Palestine (region)
Flora of Yemen
Forages
Pantropical flora
Plants described in 1781